Preston upon the Weald Moors is a civil parish in the district of Telford and Wrekin, Shropshire, England.  It contains six listed buildings that are recorded in the National Heritage List for England.  Of these, one is listed at Grade I, the highest of the three grades, one is at Grade II*, the middle grade, and the others are at Grade II, the lowest grade.  The parish contains the village of Preston upon the Weald Moors and the surrounding countryside.  Five of the listed buildings are in the village, and consist of a group of almshouses and its associated lodges, two farmhouses and a church, and to the southeast of the village is a timber framed house.


Key

Buildings

References

Citations

Sources

Lists of buildings and structures in Shropshire